Zizula cyna, the cyna blue, is a butterfly species in the family Lycaenidae.

Distribution
The cyna blue is found from southern Texas, south through Mexico and Central America, to Argentina in South America.

They are usually found in subtropical areas and deserts.

Strays can be found up to northern Texas and Kansas, and southern Arizona.

Description
The wingspan of Zizula cyna is 16–22 mm (5/8–7/8 of an inch).

Its upper-side is a violet blue, while its underside is a pale gray covered in tiny black dots.

Adults are on wing from March to November.

Food
The larvae feed on flower buds of Acanthaceae species. Adults feed on flower nectar.

References

External links
Zizula cyna Butterflies and Moths of North America

Polyommatini
Butterflies of North America
Butterflies of Central America
Lycaenidae of South America
Lepidoptera of Argentina
Lepidoptera of Brazil
Lepidoptera of Venezuela
Butterflies described in 1881